The 1967 Big Ten Conference football season was the 72nd season of college football played by the member schools of the Big Ten Conference and was a part of the 1967 NCAA University Division football season.

The season resulted in a three-way tie for the conference championship, as Indiana, Purdue, and Minnesota each finished with a conference record of 6–1. Each team was 1–1 against the others; as Indiana defeated Purdue, Purdue defeated Minnesota, and Minnesota defeated Indiana. As of 2019, this was the last conference championship for both Indiana and Minnesota. Purdue has won one conference title since then, in 2000.

The 1967 Indiana Hoosiers football team, under head coach John Pont, was ranked No. 4 in the final AP Poll. The Hoosiers lost to USC in the 1968 Rose Bowl. Quarterback Harry Gonso was selected as the team's most valuable player.

The 1967 Purdue Boilermakers football team, under head coach Jack Mollenkopf, was ranked No. 9 in the final AP Poll. Purdue running back Leroy Keyes led the conference with 114 points scored, was a consensus first-team All-American, won the Chicago Tribune Silver Football trophy as the most valuable player in the conference, and finished third in the voting for the 1968 Heisman Trophy. 

The 1967 Minnesota Golden Gophers football team, under head coach Murray Warmath, was unranked in the final AP Poll (which ranked only ten teams at the time), but was 14th in the final Coaches Poll. Offensive tackle John Williams was the first Big Ten player selected in the 1968 NFL/AFL Draft with the 23rd overall pick.

Season overview

Results and team statistics

Key
AP final = Team's rank in the final AP Poll of the 1967 season
AP high = Team's highest rank in the AP Poll throughout the 1967 season
PPG = Average of points scored per game
PAG = Average of points allowed per game
MVP = Most valuable player as voted by players on each team as part of the voting process to determine the winner of the Chicago Tribune Silver Football trophy; trophy winner in bold

Preseason

Regular season

Bowl games

Post-season developments

Statistical leaders

The Big Ten's individual statistical leaders for the 1967 season include the following:

Passing yards

Rushing yards

Receiving yards

Total yards

Scoring

Awards and honors

All-Big Ten honors

The following players were picked by the Associated Press (AP) and/or the United Press International (UPI) as first-team players on the 1967 All-Big Ten Conference football team.

Offense

Defense

All-American honors

At the end of the 1967 season, only one Big Ten player secured consensus first-team honors on the 1967 College Football All-America Team. The Big Ten's consensus All-Americans was:

Other Big Ten players who were named first-team All-Americans by at least one selector were:

Other awards
The 1967 Heisman Trophy was awarded to Gary Beban of UCLA. Purdue running back Leroy Keyes finished third in the voting.

1968 NFL/AFL Draft
The following Big Ten players were among the first 100 picks in the 1968 NFL/AFL Draft:

References